Gartow is a Samtgemeinde ("collective municipality") in the district of Lüchow-Dannenberg, in Lower Saxony, Germany. Its seat is in the village Gartow.

The Samtgemeinde Gartow consists of the following municipalities:

Gartow
Gorleben 
Höhbeck 
Prezelle
Schnackenburg

Samtgemeinden in Lower Saxony